Lectionary 302 designated by siglum ℓ 302 (in the Gregory-Aland numbering). 
It is a Greek minuscule manuscript of the New Testament, written on paper. Palaeographically it has been assigned to the 15th century.

Description 
The codex contains weekday lessons from the Gospels lectionary (Evangelistarium), on 199 paper leaves (31 by 21.7 cm), with some lacunae. The text is written in two columns per page, in 28 lines per page. The manuscript contains weekday Gospel lessons.

History 

The manuscript was brought to America in 1844 from Canea in Crete, by George Benton (along with Minuscule 670, and Minuscule 669). It was examined by J. Rendel Harris.

The manuscript was added to the list of New Testament manuscripts by Caspar René Gregory (number 302e).

The codex now is located in the Kenneth Willis Clark Collection of the Duke University (Gk MS 83)  at Durham.

See also 
 List of New Testament lectionaries
 Biblical manuscripts
 Textual criticism

References

Further reading 

 K. W. Clark, A Descriptive Catalogue of Greek New Testament Manuscripts in America, Chicago: The University of Chicago Press, 1937, pp. 82-83.

External links 

 Lectionary 302 at the Kenneth Willis Clark Collection of Greek Manuscripts 

Greek New Testament lectionaries
15th-century biblical manuscripts
Duke University Libraries